PP-88 Mianwali-IV is a Constituency of Provincial Assembly of Punjab.

General elections 2013

General elections 2008

See also
 PP-87 Mianwali-III
 PP-89 Bhakkar-I

References

External links
 Election commission Pakistan's official website
 Awazoday.com check result
 Official Website of Government of Punjab

Provincial constituencies of Punjab, Pakistan